The Holtz Site, designated 20AN26 is an archaeological site located near Bellaire, Michigan. It is located on an island in the Intermediate River near Bellaire, Michigan. The site is surrounded by low, swampy areas.

The site was excavated in 1967 by researchers from Michigan State University.  Artifacts found on the site indicate it was a Middle Woodland period encampment, dating to around AD 200-400.  It was likely inhabited for a short time by people from southern Michigan who traveled north for a season.

The site was designated a Michigan State Historic Site in 1970 and listed on the National Register of Historic Places in 1973.

Five different features were discovered at the site. These were:
 A small hearth measuring about 1.4 by 1.5 feet.
 A concentration of potsherds.
 A modern fire pit.
 Materials associated with hearth activities, but no the hearth itself.
 A second concentration of pottery.

References

Further reading

Archaeological sites on the National Register of Historic Places in Michigan
Geography of Antrim County, Michigan
National Register of Historic Places in Antrim County, Michigan